Tetradonia is a genus of rove beetles in the family Staphylinidae. There are at least three described species in Tetradonia.

Species
These three species belong to the genus Tetradonia:
 Tetradonia anteopaca Pace, 2015
 Tetradonia guyanensis Pace, 2015
 Tetradonia megalops (Casey, 1906)

References

Further reading

 
 
 
 
 

Aleocharinae
Articles created by Qbugbot